This is a list of flag bearers who have represented Armenia at the Olympics.

Flag bearers carry the national flag of their country at the opening ceremony of the Olympic Games.

See also
Armenia at the Olympics

References

Armenia at the Olympics
Armenia
Olympic